The flag of the President of Colombia It consists, like the flag of Colombia, in a rectangle in yellow, blue and red triband in a 2:1:1 ratio, meaning three horizontal stripes, with yellow at the top occupying half the width of the flag, blue at the bottom. middle occupying a quarter of the width and red below, occupying the last quarter, finished off in the central part with the coat of arms of Colombia.

Early presidential flags 
The first record of the adoption of a presidential flag dates back to 9 November 1949, when the use of the presidential flag was established through the constitution, the official flag will be a standardized version of the national flag using the coat of arms of the Republic of Colombia.

Presidential flag (1861–1890)

The presidential flag of the United States was composed of the traditional colors with a central obalo on a blue background, composed of 9 8-pointed stars, this flag also served as a merchant flag.

Presidential flag (2002–2010) 

Over the past 15 years, two governments have sequentially discontinued the original design of the presidential flag, replacing the Colombian coat of arms with the Coat of Arms, a version of the current coat of arms enclosed in a red circle and bearing the inscriptions Republica de Colombia. and the motto ''Libertad y Orden".

Within the marked changes of the Uribe administration, one of the most visible changes was the incorporation of an almost exclusive design of the presidential flag, making use in this time of war in Colombia, a standardized version of the shield of arams for exclusive use by the armed forces.

Presidential flag (2010–2014) 
During this period, the administration of President Santos kept some of the changes of the past administration, one of them without a doubt was the presidential flag, which was also used in protocol events, in addition to the use of similar designs to identify some state entity, with the use of the coat of arms enclosed in red, identifying the corresponding entity.

Current flag 
The current flag makes use of the coat of arms alone, without the incorrect use of red border and inscriptions on it, as established by the constitution.

See also 
 Flag of Colombia
 President of Colombia
 Coat of Arms of Colombia

References 

 Flag
Flags of Colombia
Flag of the President
Flags displaying animals